Nicoletta Tinti (born 22 May 1979) is an Italian rhythmic gymnast. She competed in the women's group all-around event at the 1996 Summer Olympics.

References

1979 births
Living people
Italian rhythmic gymnasts
Olympic gymnasts of Italy
Gymnasts at the 1996 Summer Olympics
Sportspeople from Arezzo